The Sidemen is a British YouTube group consisting of Internet personalities KSI, Miniminter, Zerkaa, TBJZL, Behzinga, Vikkstar123, and W2S. The group produce videos of various challenges, sketches, and video game commentaries across their YouTube channels, which have a combined total of over 138 million subscribers .

Members 

The group has the following members:
 Olajide "JJ" Olatunji – known online as KSI 
 Simon Minter – known online as Miniminter 
 Joshua Bradley – known online as Zerkaa 
 Tobit "Tobi" Brown – known online as Tobjizzle or TBJZL 
 Ethan Payne – known online as Behzinga 
 Vikram "Vik" Barn – known online as Vikkstar123 
 Harry Lewis – known online as Wroetoshaw or W2S

History 
Some of the members knew each other before the group was formed. Bradley and Brown both attended Bexley Grammar School in London and Olatunji and Minter both attended Berkhamsted School in Hertfordshire.

The group originates from a Rockstar Games Social Club group made on 19 October 2013 in Grand Theft Auto Online, called "The Ultimate Sidemen", which included all the members except for Lewis. In January 2014, Bradley met Lewis while at a FIFA gaming event in New York City and invited him to join the group. Describing the group name, Minter said in a video that "A sideman is basically someone's bitch who just follows them around [...] I was basically JJ's bitch that followed him around."

In February 2014, Olatunji, Minter, Bradley, and Barn moved into a house together near London, which they referred to as the "Sidemen House", which allowed them to collaborate more often.

On 1 December 2020, the group's eponymous YouTube channel surpassed 10 million subscribers. Each member of the group was awarded their own Diamond Play Button by YouTube to mark their milestone.

YouTube content 
The group has five YouTube channels, Sidemen, MoreSidemen, SidemenReacts, SidemenShorts and Sidemen en Español across which it publishes a variety of videos including challenges, sketches and video game commentaries.

, the Sidemen channel has over 16.9 million subscribers and 4.4 billion views, MoreSidemen has over 7 million subscribers and 2.8 billion views, SidemenReacts has over 4.8 million subscribers and 1.7 billion views, and SidemenShorts has over 1.8 million subscribers and 1 billion views.

On 18 June 2018, the group released a web television series titled The Sidemen Show, available exclusively on YouTube Premium. It comprises seven 30-minute episodes filmed around the world alongside a number of celebrity guests.

In March 2020, the Sidemen released a twenty-minute YouTube video titled "#StayHome". The video featured the Sidemen and more than one hundred other YouTube video creators and other celebrities raising awareness of the UK's "stay at home" campaign which aimed to reduce the spread of COVID-19 in the UK. All of the advertising revenue generated from the video was donated to the NHS.

Other projects 
Since 2014, the group has sold and distributed Sidemen Clothing merchandise.

On 18 October 2016, the group released a book titled Sidemen: The Book, published by Coronet Books, and embarked on a UK-wide promotional tour. A number one best-seller in the UK, the book sold 26,436 copies within the first three days of its release.

In 2021, the Sidemen launched a subscription service known as Side+. They also launched a restaurant chain known as Sides, and a vodka known as XIX Vodka.

Charity football matches 

The group has hosted four football events to raise money for various charitable causes. In all matches so far, the group's seven members and various affiliated YouTubers competed as Sidemen Football Club, while various other YouTubers competed as the YouTube Allstars. The first match, in 2016, was held at St Mary's Stadium, Southampton, raising over £110,000 for the Saints Foundation. All subsequent matches since were held at The Valley, London. The second and third matches, in 2017 and 2018, respectively raised £210,000 for the NSPCC and the Charlton Athletic Community Trust, and £65,747 for the Young Minds Trust and the Charlton Athletic Community Trust. The fourth match, in 2022, raised over £1,000,000 for CALM, Teenage Cancer Trust, Rays of Sunshine and M7 Education.

Discography

Publications

Awards and nominations

Notes

References

External links 

 

British video bloggers
English YouTube groups
Comedy YouTubers
English-language YouTube channels
Gaming YouTubers
Let's Players
Surreal comedy
Video bloggers
Video game commentators
Vlogs-related YouTube channels
YouTube channels launched in 2016
YouTube vloggers
KSI